Elizabeth Anne Bingham OBE is a British businesswoman and president of R3, the industry body for restructuring professionals.

A managing partner at EY (Ernst and Young), she joined the firm in 1986 having previously worked at BDO Stoy Hayward.

She is a leading campaigner for diversity in the workplace for which she has been named a Stonewall Role Model. She was appointed Officer of the Order of the British Empire (OBE) in the 2015 New Year Honours for services to equality in the workplace.

Awards 
She has an Honorary Doctorate of Business Administration from BPP University

Other awards she has received include:
 2012 award for achievement from Women in Banking & Finance
 2012 ranked 31 in the World Pride Power List of influential LGBT people worldwide
 2013 ranked 27 by Accountancy Age in the Financial Power List
 2013 named in the BBC Radio 4 Woman's Hour 100 Power List 
 2013 one of Cranfield's 100 Women to Watch list.
 2014 ranked 18 in the FT Top 50 Outstanding in Business List.

In April 2014, she was a judge in the BBC Woman's Hour power list 2014.

References 

Living people
British businesspeople
Year of birth missing (living people)
Place of birth missing (living people)
Officers of the Order of the British Empire
British LGBT businesspeople